Milia are small cysts that can appear just under the epidermis or on the roof of the mouth.

Milia may also refer to:

Characters
Milia Fallyna Jenius, a character from anime series The Super Dimension Fortress Macross

People
Milia Aleksic (born 1951), a football goalkeeper
Milia Gataullina (born 1971), a Russian graphic designer

Places
Milia, Evros, a village in Evros regional unit, Greece
Milia, Famagusta, a village in Famagusta District, Cyprus
Milia, Paphos, a small village in Paphos District, Cyprus
Milia, Pieria, a community in Katerini, Greece
El Milia, a town in Jilel province, Algeria
El Milia District, the district containing the town

See also 
Malia (disambiguation)
Milea (disambiguation), a term referring to various Greek sites
 Jamia Millia Islamia, university in India
Milija (name)